Sādhanā is an ego-transcending  spiritual practice. It includes a variety of disciplines in Hindu, Buddhist and Jain traditions that are followed in order to achieve various spiritual or ritual objectives.

Sadhana is done for attaining detachment from worldly things, which can be a goal of a Sadhu. Karma yoga,  Bhakti yoga and Gnyan yoga can also be described as Sadhana, in that constant efforts to achieve maximum level of perfection in all streams in day-to-day life can be described as Sadhana.

Sādhanā can also refer to a tantric liturgy or liturgical manual, that is, the instructions to carry out a certain practice.

Definitions
The historian N. Bhattacharyya provides a working definition of the benefits of sādhanā as follows:

B. K. S. Iyengar (1993: p. 22), in his English translation of and commentary to the Yoga Sutras of Patanjali, defines sādhanā in relation to abhyāsa and kriyā:

Paths 
The term sādhanā means "methodical discipline to attain desired knowledge or goal". Sadhana is also done for attaining detachment from worldly things, which can be a goal in itself. A person undertaking such a practice is known in Sanskrit as a sādhu (female sādhvi), sādhaka (female sādhakā) or yogi (Tibetan pawo; feminine yogini or dakini, Tibetan khandroma). The goal of sādhanā is to attain some level of spiritual realization, which can be either enlightenment, pure love of God (prema), liberation (moksha) from the cycle of birth and death (saṃsāra), or a particular goal such as the blessings of a deity as in the Bhakti traditions.

Sādhanā can involve meditation, chanting of mantra sometimes with the help of prayer beads, puja to a deity, yajña, and in very rare cases mortification of the flesh or tantric practices such as performing one's particular sādhanā within a cremation ground.

Traditionally in some Hindu and Buddhist traditions in order to embark on a specific path of sādhanā, a guru may be required to give the necessary instructions. This approach is typified by some Tantric traditions, in which initiation by a guru is sometimes identified as a specific stage of sādhanā.  On the other hand, individual renunciates may develop their own spiritual practice without participating in organized groups.

Sādhanā in Yoga 
The Yoga Sutras has 196 sūtras with ideas and wisdom that a sādhaka can take for a path towards self-realization. B. K. S. Iyengar (1993: p. 3) notes that:Kriyāyoga gives us the practical disciplines needed to scale the spiritual heights.....the four padas of the Yoga Sūtras describe different disciplines of practice, the qualities or aspects of which vary according to the development of intelligence and refinement of consciousness of each sādhaka. In the Yoga Sutras II.1, Patañjali and his commentators write that the Kriyāyoga (action-oriented type of yoga) is to be undertaken by those whose mind is not already fixed. The fixing or "stilling of the changing states of mind" (Yoga Sutras I.2) is the goal of yoga, for which Kriyāyoga is necessary as a first step for a sādhaka. There are three aspects of Kriyāyoga:

 Discipline - tapas, comprises the "sāttvicizing" of one's sensual engagements or controlling one's senses and making sure that what they consume is amenable to a sattvic mind.
 Study - svādhyāya, is taken by Vyāsa, the main commentator on the Yoga Sutras, to refer to the chanting of mantras (an act which is usually termed japa) and the study of scriptures (jñāna). 
 Dedication to God - Īśvara-praṇidhāna, meaning dedicating all of ones actions to God (Īśvara), which the commentators implicitly refer to the bhakti-centered karma-yoga that is described in the second chapter of the Gita.
Vachaspati Mishra, an influential commentator on the Yoga Sutras, notes that these three aspects of Kriyāyoga are necessary in order to purify the mind, making it more sāttvic than rājasic or tāmasic. Such purity of the mind allows one to then cultivate practice (abhyāsa) and dispassion (vairāgya), which are prerequisites for achieving the stilling of the mind.

Tantric sādhanā 

The tantric rituals are called "sādhanā". Some of the well known sādhanās are:

 śāva sādhanā (sādhanā done while visualizing sitting on a corpse).
 śmaśāna sādhanā (sādhanā done while visualizing being in a crematorium or cremation ground).
 pañca-muṇḍa sādhanā (sādhanā done while visualizing sitting on a seat of five skulls).

Buddhism 
In Vajrayāna Buddhism and the Nalanda tradition, there are fifteen major tantric sādhanās:
 Śūraṅgama/Sitātapatrā
 Nīlakaṇṭha
 Tārā
 Mahākāla
 Hayagrīva
 Amitābha
 Bhaiṣajyaguru/Akṣobhya
 Guhyasamāja
 Vajrayoginī/Vajravārāhī
 Heruka/Cakrasaṃvara
 Yamāntaka
 Kālacakra
 Hevajra
 Chöd
 Vajrapāṇi
Avalokiteśvara

Not within this list but a central sādhanā in Vajrayana is that of Vajrasattva.

All of these are available in Tibetan form, many are available in Chinese and some are still extant in ancient Sanskrit manuscripts.

Kværne (1975: p. 164) in his extended discussion of sahajā, treats the relationship of sādhanā to mandala thus:

See also 

 Chilla (retreat)
 Guru–shishya tradition
 Lojong
 Mahayana
 Transfer of merit
 Vedic chant
 Monasticism
 Samyama (Holding Together)

Notes 

Hindu practices
Buddhist meditation
Tibetan Buddhist practices
Spiritual practice
Three teachings